is a Japanese politician of the Liberal Democratic Party, a member of the House of Representatives in the National Diet (national legislature of Japan). He is affiliated to the revisionist lobby Nippon Kaigi.

Personal and corporate backgrounds
A native of Tokyo, he graduated from Keio University with the bachelor's degree in Political Science in March 1997. In April 1997, he got a job in The Bank of Tokyo-Mitsubishi (now The Bank of Tokyo-Mitsubishi UFJ). After retiring from that in March 2003, he started managing real estate in order to earn studying in the United States and caring for his father. In July 2003, he participated in summer program of Stanford University. In June 2005, he received a master's degree in Public Policy from John F. Kennedy School of Government at Harvard University in the United States.

He is married to Tamayo Marukawa (a member of the House of Councillors and former announcer of TV Asahi). Their wedding ceremony was held in Meiji Shrine on June 16, 2008.

Political career
He was elected to the House of Representatives (constituency: Saitama 9) for the first time in 2005.
State Minister of Finance
Parliamentary Vice-Minister of Justice
Director, Judicial Affairs Division, LDP
Chief Secretary, Japan-Australia Parliamentary Association
Chief Secretary, Japan-Philippines, Parliamentary Friendship Association
Areas of interest: 
Defense/National Security Policies
International Trade/Monetary Policies
Science Technology Policies

References

 
Profile on LDP website: jimin.jp/english/profile/members/121004.html

External links 
  

1973 births
Living people
Keio University alumni
Harvard Kennedy School alumni
Koizumi Children
Members of the House of Representatives (Japan)
Spouses of Japanese politicians
Members of Nippon Kaigi
Liberal Democratic Party (Japan) politicians